Mathieu Troonbeeckx (born 16 February 1998) is a Belgian footballer who plays for Heist.

Club career
On 20 March 2021, he agreed on a return to Heist.

References

1998 births
Living people
Belgian footballers
Association football defenders
K.S.K. Heist players
Sint-Truidense V.V. players
Lierse Kempenzonen players
Belgian Pro League players
Challenger Pro League players
Belgian Third Division players